Wedding Central was a short-lived American digital cable television channel that focused on programming involving brides and weddings, which was a spin-off of the programming which made up much of WE tv's schedule at the network's launch on August 18, 2009. The network was launched by the Rainbow Media subsidiary of Cablevision. Much of the network's programming was taken from previously aired WE tv wedding programming and wedding-related motion pictures, with little new content offered outside of promotions and on-screen quizzes. Also offered solely on Cablevision systems was interactive television components such as quizzes, polls, voting, and advertising opportunities for national and local wedding retailers.

Unlike WE tv, which was a successful spin-off of AMC itself in 1997, the network had only limited distribution, only being carried on the systems of Cablevision, a limited amount of Time Warner Cable systems, and Mediacom. When Cablevision spun off Rainbow Media into a separate public company known as AMC Networks via an initial public offering on July 1, 2011, the new company closed Wedding Central on the same day. Wedding-related programming returned to have a focus on WE tv, and Wedding Central's website now redirects to WE tv's weddings section.

Programming

Series formerly featured on Wedding Central included:

 Always a Bridesmaid
 Amazing Wedding Cakes
 Beach Weddings
 Bridezillas
 Girl Meets Cowboy
 How to Marry a Prince
 My Big Fat Fabulous Wedding
 Rich Bride Poor Bride
 Single in the City
 The Wedding Planners
 Wedding Cake Masters

References

Defunct television networks in the United States
AMC Networks
Television channels and stations established in 2009
Television channels and stations disestablished in 2011
English-language television stations in the United States
Wedding television shows